Ivan Ivanov, (1891–1965) was a Bulgarian engineer and mayor of Sofia in the period 25 May 1934 – 9 September 1944. He was born in Sliven. He has studied in Stara Zagora, the Military school of Sofia, and in 1915 he graduated civil engineering in Munich, Germany.

During World War I he headed a railroad construction in Macedonia. In 1919 he has been appointed deputy head of the water supply department of Sofia. In 1924 he started working on what turned out to be his most recognised work - the water supply line from Rila mountain to Sofia. The project had a total length of 82 km, which includes 38.5 km channels, 17.9 km tunnels and 25.3 km tubes. The line was completed in 1933.

In 1934 Ivanov was elected mayor of Sofia. He focused his efforts on eliminating the corruption and bureaucracy in the city hall. He published monthly the expenses the city hall has made. In 1938 the first urban plan of Sofia was created. During his term all the streets of Sofia were paved and bus and trolley-bus mass transport has been introduced. He also started large-scale tree planting on the streets of Sofia. By the end of his term Ivanov was planning the construction of Beli Iskar Dam, which had to feed the Sofia water supply line.

After the Bulgarian coup d'état of 1944 Ivanov was imprisoned and sentenced for life for political reasons. Anyway, his abilities as a hydro-engineer were recognised by the communist rulers and he was allowed to continue working on the Beli Iskar Dam. Initially he worked from his prison cell, and later on he was set free.

He died in 1965.

References

1891 births
1965 deaths
People from Sliven
Technical University of Munich alumni
Bulgarian civil engineers
Mayors of Sofia